Fireman is the first album by the Canadian alternative rock band hHead. It was released in 1993 (then re-released in 1994 by I.R.S. Records). The album was a success on Canada's independent record charts, selling more than 10,000 copies.

It was first released independently as a cassette by hHead themselves and then released under Jam Entertainment Records. After hHead signed to I.R.S. in 1994 to release Jerk, they also re-released the CD version of Fireman. There was also a version that had 14 tracks (Under Jam Entertainment Records).

The album was recorded in a few days in northern California. Video clips for "Flower" and "Collide" were made. hHead supported the album with a Canadian tour. Fireman helped the band win $100,000 from CFNY-FM.

Track listing 
"Superstar" - 5:23
"Collide" - 4:03
"Fireman" - 3:43
"Jockstrap" - 4:17
"Burn" - 4:07^
"Flower" - 5:28
"Brain" - 5:13^
"Parking" - 3:57
"Moron" - 7:12
 Brain was only released on the cassette and 14-track version of the album.

Alternate Track Listing
"Superstar" - 5:23
"Collide" - 4:03
"Fireman" - 3:43
"Jockstrap" - 4:17
"Burn" - 4:07
"Flower" - 5:28
"Brain" - 5:13
"Parking" - 3:57
"Moron" - 7:12
"Shotgun" - 3:33
"Ohh" - 4:31
"'Dis" - 4:03
"Life" - 5:52
"Rat" - 4:43

References

HHead albums
1993 albums